Events from the year 2008 in Brazil.

Incumbents

Federal government
 President: Luiz Inácio Lula da Silva 
 Vice President: José Alencar Gomes da Silva

Governors
 Acre: Binho Marques
 Alagoas: Teotônio Vilela Filho
 Amapa: Waldez Góes 
 Amazonas: Eduardo Braga 
 Bahia: Jaques Wagner
 Ceará: Cid Gomes
 Espírito Santo: Paulo Hartung
 Goiás: Alcides Rodrigues
 Maranhão: Jackson Lago 
 Mato Grosso: Blairo Maggi 
 Mato Grosso do Sul: André Puccinelli
 Minas Gerais: Aécio Neves 
 Pará: Ana Júlia Carepa
 Paraíba: Cássio Cunha Lima 
 Parana: Roberto Requião de Mello e Silva 
 Pernambuco: Eduardo Campos
 Piauí: Wellington Dias 
 Rio de Janeiro: Sérgio Cabral Filho
 Rio Grande do Norte: Wilma Maria de Faria
 Rio Grande do Sul: Yeda Rorato Crusius
 Rondônia: Ivo Narciso Cassol 
 Roraima: José de Anchieta Júnior
 Santa Catarina: Luiz Henrique da Silveira 
 São Paulo: José Serra 
 Sergipe: Marcelo Déda
 Tocantins: Marcelo Miranda

Vice governors
 Acre:	Carlos César Correia de Messias
 Alagoas: José Wanderley Neto 
 Amapá: Pedro Paulo Dias de Carvalho 
 Amazonas: Omar José Abdel Aziz 
 Bahia: Edmundo Pereira Santos
 Ceará: Francisco José Pinheiro 
 Espírito Santo: Ricardo de Rezende Ferraço 
 Goiás: Ademir de Oliveira Meneses 
 Maranhão: Luís Carlos Porto 
 Mato Grosso: Silval da Cunha Barbosa 
 Mato Grosso do Sul: Murilo Zauith 
 Minas Gerais: Antonio Augusto Junho Anastasia 
 Pará: Odair Santos Corrêa 
 Paraíba: José Lacerda Neto 
 Paraná: Orlando Pessuti 
 Pernambuco: João Soares Lyra Neto
 Piauí: Wilson Martins 
 Rio de Janeiro: Luiz Fernando Pezão 
 Rio Grande do Norte: Iberê Ferreira 
 Rio Grande do Sul: Paulo Afonso Girardi Feijó 
 Rondônia: João Aparecido Cahulla
 Roraima: vacant
 Santa Catarina: Leonel Pavan 
 São Paulo: Alberto Goldman 
 Sergipe: Belivaldo Chagas Silva 
 Tocantins: Paulo Sidnei Antunes

Events
 October 13 – Eloá Pimentel hostage crisis
 November 3 – Banks Itaú and Unibanco merge into Itaú Unibanco.

Deaths
 January 21 – Luiz Carlos Tourinho, actor (b. 1964)
 March 29 – Isabella Nardoni, murder victim (b. 2002)
 June 24 – Ruth Cardoso, anthropologist, educator and public figure (b. 1930)
 July 19 – Dercy Gonçalves, comedian (b. 1907)

See also
 2008 in Brazilian football
 2008 in Brazilian television
 List of Brazilian films of 2008

References

 
2000s in Brazil
Years of the 21st century in Brazil
Brazil
Brazil